Killing Michael Jackson is a 2019 documentary film directed and produced by ZigZag, focusing on the death of singer Michael Jackson. The documentary features Orlando Martinez, Dan Myers and Scott Smith – three detectives who were involved in the initial investigation of Jackson's death.

Synopsis
On June 25, 2009, American singer Michael Jackson died of acute propofol and benzodiazepine intoxication at his home on North Carolwood Drive in the Holmby Hills. His personal physician, Conrad Murray, said he found Jackson in his room, not breathing and with a weak pulse, and administered CPR on Jackson to no avail.

On August 28, 2009, the Los Angeles County Coroner ruled that Jackson's death was a homicide. Shortly before his death, Jackson had reportedly been administered propofol and two anti-anxiety benzodiazepines, lorazepam and midazolam, in his home. Law enforcement officials charged Murray with involuntary manslaughter on November 7, 2011 and he served two years of his four-year prison sentence, with early release for good behavior.

The documentary debuted in North America on September 7, 2020, on Bounce TV.

See also
 Death of Michael Jackson

References

External links
 

2019 television films
2019 films
American documentary films
British documentary films
Biographical documentary films
2019 documentary films
Documentary films about Michael Jackson
2010s American films
2010s British films